Parliamentary elections were held in the Kingdom of Dalmatia in 1901.

Results

Elections in Croatia
Dalmatia
1901 in Croatia
Elections in Austria-Hungary
History of Dalmatia
Election and referendum articles with incomplete results